The 2001 Baseball World Cup (BWC) was the 34th international Men's amateur baseball tournament. The tournament was sanctioned by the International Baseball Federation, which titled it the Amateur World Series from the 1938 tournament through the 1986 AWS. The tournament was held, for the first time, in Taiwan, from 6 to 18 November. Cuba defeated the United States in the final, winning its 23rd title.

There were 16 participating countries, split into two groups, with the first four of each group qualifying for the finals.

The next five competitions were also held as the BWC tournament, which was replaced in 2015 by the quadrennial WBSC Premier12.

First round

Pool A

Pool B

Playoffs

Final standings

Awards

See also
 List of sporting events in Taiwan

References

External links
XXXIV Baseball World Cup - XXXIV Copa del Mundo de Béisbol

Baseball World Cup
Baseball World Cup
2001
2001 in baseball
Baseball World Cup